Peeping Tom Reloaded is the second compilation album, fifth album overall, by German eurodance/trance project S.E.X. Appeal. The album, which is a reworked version of their Debut album "Peeping Tom" and also spawned the two new singles "Sex on the phone" and "Gimme (Safer Sex)" featuring LayZee, was released in 2010 and consists of nine song remixes of their Debut album, four new single remixes (two of "Sex on the phone" and two of "Gimme (Safer Sex)") and one remix of a previously unreleased song called "I can't believe it". Unusually the album/single versions of the two single releases don't appear on the albums's standard edition, but only on the bonus disc of the "Special 2-Disc Edition".

Track listings 
Standard edition
   Sex on the phone (D. Mand remix) – 4:44
   Fragile love (Bassreactor remix) – 5:31
   Hanky Spanky (Amanii remix) – 3:30
   Sex is a thrill with the pill (Bassreactor remix) – 5:01
   Gimme (Safer Sex) (M&Ace remix) – 6:18 (feat. LayZee)
   It's called Atlantis (Ken Kay remix) – 4:38
   Fragile love (C-NRG remix) – 5:28
   Sex on the phone (Bootleggerz remix) – 5:56
   Manga maniac (Amanii remix) – 5:38
   I can't believe it (Beatbreaker remix) – 3:09
   Gimme (Safer Sex) (D. Mands Electro Bigroom mix) – 5:51
   It's called Atlantis (Illuminati remix) – 4:56
   Fragile love (Technorocker remix) – 4:44
   Peeping Tom (RainDropz! remix) – 3:20

Special 2-disc edition

Disc 1:
(Same as standard edition)
 
Disc 2: (bonus extended versions & remixes for DJs)
   Sex on the phone – 4:18
   Gimme (Safer Sex) (feat. LayZee) – 3:54
   Love 2 love (Electrophunk club mix edit) – 3:19
   Love 2 love (Twister's extended Electro club mix) – 5:28
   Love 2 love (Electrophunk extended mix) – 5:20
   Voodoo queen (Alex Twister Electro remix) – 6:09
   Voodoo queen (Bass Up! remix) – 4:15
   Sensuality (Bass Up! remix) – 5:21

2010 albums
S.E.X. Appeal albums